Zumbi Esporte Clube is a Brazilian football club based in União dos Palmares, Alagoas. It competes in the Campeonato Alagoano Segunda Divisão, the second division of the Alagoas state football league.

History
The club was founded on 15 November 1954, being named after Zumbi, who was the last leader of the Quilombo dos Palmares.

Stadium

Zumbi Esporte Clube play their home games at Estádio Orlando Gomes de Barros, nicknamed Praxedão. The stadium has a maximum capacity of 3,000 people.

References

Association football clubs established in 1954
Football clubs in Alagoas
1954 establishments in Brazil